Anthony Allison (born May 5, 1987) is a Liberian footballer who currently plays for Philadelphia Lone Star FC in the National Premier Soccer League. Allison previously played for the Puerto Rico Islanders in the USSF Division 2 Professional League in 2010 before signing with IFK Sundsvall in 2011.

Career

Youth and College
Allison grew up in Philadelphia, Pennsylvania, attended Overbrook High School, and played club soccer for Junior Lone Star FC, before playing college soccer at Wilmington University. While at Wilmington University, he was the CACC Rookie of the Year, and received All CACC 1st Team and NSCAA All Region 2nd Team honors three years in a row in 2006, 2007 and 2008. Following his senior year Allison was also honored as CACC Player of the Year and East Regional Player of the Year and was a 1st Team All CACC, NSCAA All-Region First Team,  Daktronics 1st Team All Region and 1st Team All American selection. Allison. He finished his college career with 56 goals and 26 assists in 72 games for the Wildcats.

Professional
Undrafted out of college, Allison turned professional in 2010 when he signed with the Puerto Rico Islanders of the USSF D2 Pro League. He made his professional debut on April 16, 2010, in a 2010 CFU Club Championship game against Haitian side Racing des Gonaïves. After two successful goal scoring seasons in the Swedish fifth and fourth tier during 2011 and 2012 Allison signed with third tier club Umeå FC in March 2013.

Personal
Allison's birth name was Sargbah Tarpeh; he changed it to its current form in 2009. Anthony also has 4 children. He is  married to his wife Siatta. Liberian international footballer Dulee Johnson is his uncle.

Honors

Puerto Rico Islanders
USSF Division 2 Pro League Champions (1): 2010
CFU Club Championship Winner (1): 2010
Sigma Beta Delta National Honors Society in Business Management and Administration 2018

References

External links
 Wilmington bio
 
 Eliteprospects profile

1987 births
Living people
Liberian footballers
Liberian expatriate footballers
Liberian emigrants to the United States
Expatriate footballers in Puerto Rico
Expatriate footballers in Sweden
USSF Division 2 Professional League players
Association football forwards
Puerto Rico Islanders players
Umeå FC players
Soccer players from New Jersey
American expatriate soccer players
Soccer players from Philadelphia
American soccer players
National Premier Soccer League players